Persoonia pungens is a species of flowering plant in the family Proteaceae and is endemic to the south-west of Western Australia. It is an erect to spreading or low-lying shrub with densely hairy young branchlets, twisted elliptic to oblong, sharply-pointed leaves, and glabrous, bright yellow flowers borne in groups of up to five.

Description

Taxonomy
Persoonia pungens was first formally described in 1912 by William Vincent Fitzgerald in the Journal of Botany, British and Foreign.

Distribution and habitat
This geebung grows in heath from near Coorow to Kellerberrin in the Avon Wheatbelt and Geraldton Sandplains biogeographic regions in the south-west of Western Australia.

Conservation status
Persoonia pungens is classified as "Priority Three" by the Government of Western Australia Department of Parks and Wildlife meaning that it is poorly known and known from only a few locations but is not under imminent threat.

References

pungens
Flora of Western Australia
Plants described in 1912
Taxa named by William Vincent Fitzgerald